Hornbeck High School is a school located in Hornbeck, Louisiana, United States. The PK-12 school is a part of the Vernon Parish School District headquartered in Leesville and has been home to Hornbeck High School, the only public school in the community, since 1898. In 1910, Hornbeck High School became an affiliated high school, although the school's crest bears the date 1913.

Administration 
Principal:  Raymond Jones

Gallery

Alma Mater 
Written in 1973 in honor of the first HHS Homecoming.
Words by Reba Jones and music by Ruth Jones and Gene Davis.

Student clubs and organizations 
 4-H
 FBLA (Future Business Leaders of America)
 FCCLA (Family, Career and Community Leaders of America)
 FCS (Fellowship of Christian Students)
 FFA
 NHS (National Honor Society)
 Quiz Bowl

Athletics 
Hornbeck High School is a member of the LHSAA (Louisiana High School Athletic Association) and competes in Class C.

References 

Public high schools in Louisiana
Schools in Vernon Parish, Louisiana
Public middle schools in Louisiana
Public elementary schools in Louisiana